China's Next Top Model is a Chinese reality TV series, based on the international version and spin-off to the original, America's Next Top Model.

The show was produced by Chinese television subscription channel Sichuan Satellite TV and it is filmed in Shanghai, the casting was held in selected cities of China - Shanghai, Beijing, Chengdu, and Guangzhou. It began airing on January 13, 2008.

Among the prizes for this season was a contract with NEXT Model Management and a campaign for Pantene.

21-year-old Yin Ge from Changsha became the first winner of China's Next Top Model.

Contestants
(ages stated are at start of contest)

Episodes

Episode 1

Casting episode.

Episode 2

First call-out: Yin Ge	
Bottom two: Ma Shu Yi & 	Yan Xue Qian	   	
Eliminated: Ma Shu Yi

Episode 3

Quit: Liu Wen Jing	
Returned: Ma Shu Yi
First call-out: Wu Mei Ting	
Bottom two: Bao Jie & Wang Jia		   	
Eliminated: Bao Jie

Episode 4

First call-out: Yan Xue Qian	
Bottom two: Tanya Zy & Zhang Xiao Pei	   	
Eliminated: Zhang Xiao Pei

Episode 5

First call-out: Ma Shu Yi	
Bottom two: Tanya Zy & Wu Mei Ting		   	
Eliminated: Tanya Zy

Episode 6

First call-out: Zhu Feng	
Bottom two: Wang Jia & Wu Mei Ting			   	
Eliminated: Wu Mei Ting

Episode 7

First call-out: Wang Jia	
Bottom two: Ma Shu Yi & Zhu Feng	   	
Eliminated: Ma Shu Yi

Episode 8

First call-out: Yin Ge	
Bottom two: Wang Jia & Yan Xue Qian	   	
Eliminated: Wang Jia

Episode 9

Quit: Zhu Feng	
Returned: Wang Jia		   	
Eliminated: None

Episode 10

First call-out: Wang Jia	
Bottom two: Yan Xue Qian	& Yin Ge		   	
Eliminated: Yan Xue Qian
Final two: Wang Jia & Yin Ge
China's Next Top Model: Yin Ge

Summaries

Call-out order

 The contestant was eliminated
 The contestant was eliminated but allowed to remain in the competition
 The contestant quit the competition
 The contestant won the competition

 In episode 3, Wen Jing decided to quit the competition, for pregnancy reasons. Shu Yi re-entered the competition to replace her.
 In episode 9, It was revealed that  Feng decided quit the competition, after the previous episode ended. She was replaced by Wang Jia, who had been eliminated the previous episode. Additionally, no elimination took place.

Average call-out order
Final two are not included.

Photo shoot guide
Episode 1 photo shoot: Posing in bikinis
Episode 2 photo shoot: Magazine covers
Episode 3 photo shoot: 1930 film sets
Episode 4 photo shoot: Swimsuits in water
Episode 5 photo shoot: Old Shanghai singers  
Episode 6 photo shoot: Superheroes
Episode 7 photo shoot: Olympic symbols
Episode 8 photo shoot & commercial: Pantene Clinicare 
Episode 9 photo shoot: MGM Grand Macau 
Episode 10 photo shoots: MGM Grand Macau; self-directed

Makeovers
Xiao Pei: Hair was curled and dyed red
Tanya: Hair was bleached and waved
Mei Ting: Flip level haircut and dyed brown
Shu Yi: Hair curled at bottom
Feng: Hair shortened
Xue Qian: Hair was bleached and curled
Wang Jia: Trimmed
Ge: Long black hair extensions

References

External links
Official Site
Article on China's Next Top Model

2008 Chinese television seasons
China's Next Top Model